Wint Smith (October 7, 1892 – April 27, 1976) was a U.S. Representative from Kansas from 1947 to 1961.

Biography 
Born in Mankato, Kansas, Smith attended a public school and graduated from Mankato High School. During the First World War he served in the United States Army as a combat infantry officer from May 11, 1917, to September 4, 1919, with twenty-four months' service overseas. He attended the University of Kansas in 1920 and the Yale Law School in 1922. He was admitted to the bar in 1923 and commenced practice in Kansas City, Kansas. He was admitted to practice in all federal courts, including the United States Supreme Court in 1934. From 1931 to 1940 he served as assistant attorney general and he was attorney for the Kansas Highway Commission from 1932 to 1940.

In 1933, the Kansas Legislature authorized the Highway Commission to hire 10 motor vehicle inspectors, increasing this number to 26 by November 1933. The legislation authorizing these inspectors charged them with the duty to patrol state highways as much as possible. In 1935, Governor Alfred Landon issued orders to the inspectors to "curb banditry" as far as the law would permit. With Landon's support, and statewide police jurisdiction, the inspectors' war on crime began.

Wint Smith, as chief of the legal department of the Highway Commission, served as director of the motor vehicle inspectors until the formation of the Kansas Highway Patrol in 1937.

During the Second World War, from May 1941 to December 1945, he served as lieutenant colonel and was the commanding officer of the 635th Tank Destroyer Battalion, with twenty-two months' service overseas. When he retired, he was promoted to brigadier general. He later resumed the practicing of law.

Smith was elected as a Republican to the 80th United States Congress and to the six succeeding Congresses (January 3, 1947 – January 3, 1961). Smith voted against the Civil Rights Acts of 1957 and 1960. He was not a candidate for renomination in 1960 to the Eighty-seventh Congress and was succeeded by fellow Republican Robert J. Dole of Russell. He subsequently returned to his home in Mankato and engaged in farming and ranching.

He died in Wichita, Kansas, April 27, 1976. He was interred in Mount Hope Cemetery, Mankato, Kansas.

References

Kansas Highway Patrol History

External links 
 

1892 births
1976 deaths
People from Mankato, Kansas
Politicians from Kansas City, Kansas
United States Army officers
Yale Law School alumni
Republican Party members of the United States House of Representatives from Kansas
20th-century American politicians